Leydens Hill is a rural locality in the Rockhampton Region, Queensland, Australia.

Geography
The Burnett Highway runs along part of the eastern boundary before passing through the eastern end to the run along the southern boundary.

Education 
There are no schools in Leydens Hill. The nearest government primary and secondary schools are Mount Morgan State School and Mount Morgan State High School, both in neighbouring Mount Morgan to the south-west.

References 

Suburbs of Rockhampton Region
Localities in Queensland